"Waiting for Love" is a song by Swedish DJ and music producer Avicii, produced by Avicii and Dutch producer Martin Garrix and featuring uncredited vocals from Simon Aldred, the former lead singer of English band Cherry Ghost. The track was released on 22 May 2015 as the lead single from Avicii's second studio album, Stories (2015). The lyrics were also written by Aldred.

History 
The track was first premiered at Ultra Music Festival 2015 both by Avicii and Dutch electronic producer Martin Garrix. Prior to its release on May 22, 2015, it was thought that the song would have been a full collaboration with Garrix and Bergling, with featuring vocals from John Legend, after several videos and Twitter posts were created stating this collaboration. The singer is confirmed to be Simon Aldred, the lead singer of Cherry Ghost.

Composition 
"Waiting For Love" is a progressive house song written in the key of F minor, follows the chord progression of F#m/C#m/D – D/E/F#m and runs at 128 BPM.

Videos

Music video 
The music video was directed by Sebastian Ringler. It begins with an old man (Sten Elfström) being taken care of by his wife (Ingrid Wallin) who then disappears one night along with some of her belongings. Upon discovering his wife missing in the morning, the man frantically searches the house and finds no trace of her. Distraught and despondent, he looks at a picture of his wife from the past before he leaves home on his mobility scooter the next day to search for her. He roams through the countryside on his scooter, witnessing many sights and wonders in his journey; including a bridge, a city, a beach, a marsh, snowy mountains, and numerous grasslands and forests. As the man's journey continues, he experiences flashbacks of him and his wife in happier times, all the while growing as a person and making unlikely friends as well as performing many good deeds along the way. He ultimately returns to his home city in the midst of a celebration and is welcomed as a celebrity, as well as discovering his wife waiting for him as they reunite and embrace in joy.

On November 17, 2022, the video reached the 1 billion view milestone, the late DJ and producer's second video to do so.

Lyric video 
The animated lyric video was uploaded on 22 May 2015. It follows the story of a dog and his owner. The dog and boy have known each other since childhood and spend as much time as possible playing with each other. Once mature enough, the owner is sent to war; leaving his dog at home. After some time, the loneliness becomes too much and the dog eventually runs off in search for his master. The dog's travels take him through many places; including a city, a snowy mountain, and a grassy field until eventually finding himself in the middle of a battlefield while nearly getting killed by a bomb blast which knocks him out and makes him experience flashbacks of him and his owner when they were younger. The dog soon wakes up and keeps going despite a few injuries, eventually finding his owner in the aftermath of a battle; wounded and the lower half of his left leg missing, but still very much alive. The video ends with both (the dog and his master) back home, their injuries healed (with the young man now sporting a prosthesis for the missing half of his leg) and living in peace like they were before. Directed and edited by Jesper Eriksson and Blackmeal's CEO Matthieu Colombel, the animation has received a "phenomenal response since its release, bringing many to tears, and even inspiring ex-military personnel to thank Avicii for making the video".

360° video 
The 360° video featuring several dancers was published on May 28, 2015, and was directed by Kurt Hugo Schneider. The 360° function of this music video only works with the web browser Google Chrome (for desktop, Android and iOS).

Track listing

Personnel 
Personnel adapted from CD single.
 Simon Aldred – songwriter, vocals
 Salem Al Fakir – songwriter
 Vincent Pontare – songwriter
 Tim Bergling – songwriter, producer
 Martijn Garritsen – songwriter, co-producer

Charts

Weekly charts

Year-end charts

Certifications

Release history

References 

2015 singles
Avicii songs
Songs written by Vincent Pontare
Songs written by Salem Al Fakir
Songs written by Avicii
Songs written by Martin Garrix
2015 songs
Universal Music Group singles
Number-one singles in Austria
Number-one singles in Hungary
Number-one singles in Norway
Number-one singles in Sweden
Songs written by Cherry Ghost